Samuel Elliott Cartwright (born 8 July 2000) is an English footballer who plays as a defender for Spalding United.

Career
Cartwright signed his first professional contract in October 2017. Grant McCann stated "Sam is an excellent young centre half. He has taken my eye since I returned to the club, I have watched his progress through the age groups. He played a few games in pre-season and has been out on-loan at a variety of different clubs to get experience. He is someone that I believe has got a good future here." The defender has had multiple loan spells, including at St Ives Town and Kettering Town. The defender made two senior appearances for the club in 2019 in the EFL Trophy, once against Arsenal Under-21s and once against Cambridge United.

On 25 September 2020, Cartwright agreed to join National League club Woking on a short-term loan.

On 11 May 2021 it was announced that he would leave Peterborough at the end of his contract.

On 8 September 2021, Cartwright joined Spalding United, following a short-term spell back with St Ives Town.

Career statistics

References

2000 births
Living people
People from Huntingdon
English footballers
Association football defenders
Peterborough United F.C. players
King's Lynn Town F.C. players
Leatherhead F.C. players
St Ives Town F.C. players
Grantham Town F.C. players
Kettering Town F.C. players
Woking F.C. players
Oxford City F.C. players
Spalding United F.C. players
English Football League players
Southern Football League players
Isthmian League players
Northern Premier League players
National League (English football) players